Albion Courthouse Square Historic District is a national historic district located in Albion, Noble County, Indiana.  The district encompasses 61 contributing buildings, 1 contributing site, and 2 contributing structures in the central business district and surrounding residential sections of Albion.  It developed between about 1855 and 1964, and includes notable examples of Greek Revival, Gothic Revival, Italianate, Romanesque Revival, Classical Revival, and Art Deco style architecture. Located in the district are the separately listed Noble County Courthouse and Noble County Sheriff's House and Jail.  Other notable buildings include the U.S. Post Office (1964), Police Booth (c. 1955), Albion Town Hall (1930), St. Mark's Lutheran Church (1905), United Brethren Church / Masonic Lodge (1886, 1903), Presbyterian Church (1876, 1951), and Clapp Block / Bank Building (c. 1882, 1925).

It was listed on the National Register of Historic Places in 2013.

References

Historic districts on the National Register of Historic Places in Indiana
Greek Revival architecture in Indiana
Gothic Revival architecture in Indiana
Italianate architecture in Indiana
Romanesque Revival architecture in Indiana
Neoclassical architecture in Indiana
Art Deco architecture in Indiana
Historic districts in Noble County, Indiana
National Register of Historic Places in Noble County, Indiana
Courthouses on the National Register of Historic Places in Indiana